USS Wakefield (AP-21) was a troop transport that served with the US Navy during World War II. Before her war service, she was the luxury ocean liner .

Manhattan was built for the United States Lines (a subsidiary of J.P. Morgan's Roosevelt International Mercantile Marine Co.) at Camden, New Jersey by the New York Shipbuilding Company. She was launched on 5 December 1931, sponsored by Mrs. Edith Kermit Roosevelt, widow of former President Theodore Roosevelt.

Commercial and pre-war service

After trials in and off the Delaware River, Manhattan departed New York City at midnight on 10 August 1932 for her maiden Atlantic crossing. Arriving at Hamburg 10 days later, she made the return voyage to New York in 5 days, 14 hours, and 28 minutes – a record for passenger liners. Carrying the title of "the fastest cabin ship in the world", the liner continued to ply the North Atlantic from New York to Hamburg, via Cobh, Ireland, Southampton, England; and Le Havre, France, into the late 1930s. When Germany recalled her ships from the high seas during the Sudeten Crisis in September 1938, Manhattan was en route to Hamburg but immediately came about and put into British and French ports instead, to bring back anxious American travelers who feared that they would be engulfed in a European war.

After war broke out a year later, she made voyages to Genoa and Naples, Italy. Following the Allied collapse in the lowlands of western Europe in the spring of 1940, she made a transatlantic crossing in July to repatriate American nationals from Portugal. With the European war endangering commercial shipping of neutral nations, Manhattan was then withdrawn from the once-lucrative transatlantic trade and placed in intercoastal service from New York to San Francisco, via the Panama Canal and Los Angeles.

Converted to troop transport
In February 1941, during her third voyage to California, Manhattan ran aground off West Palm Beach, Florida, but was pulled free by tugs after the ship was lightened. After repairs at New York the ship was delivered to the War Shipping Administration (WSA) on 14 June 1941 which immediately delivered the ship to the Navy for operation under bareboat charter. The Navy renamed her Wakefield. Converted to a troop transport at Brooklyn, New York by the Robins Drydock Company, her costly furnishings and trappings of a luxury ocean liner were carefully removed and stored for future use. All of the ship's external surfaces were painted in Navy camouflage colors. On 15 June 1941, Wakefield was commissioned.

On 13 July 1941, Wakefield departed New York to participate in joint Navy – Marine – Army – Coast Guard amphibious training exercises at New River Inlet, North Carolina, in late July and early August.

The Preamble to Convoy WS-12X (the USA has not declared war on Japan or Germany yet) 

The Atlantic Conference was held on August 9, 1941, in Placentia Bay, Newfoundland, between Prime Minister Winston Churchill and President Roosevelt. Besides the “official” agenda, Churchill hoped to obtain considerable assistance from the US, but the American President had his political hands tied. On 1 September 1941, Roosevelt received an urgent and most secret message asking for US Navy troopships manned by Navy crews and escorted by U.S.N. fighting ships to carry British troops for the purpose of reinforcing the Middle East. On 4 September the US destroyer, USS Greer (DD-145), came under an unsuccessful U-boat attack. Roosevelt gave authority to the US Navy to “shoot to kill”. On September 5 the President assured the British leader that six vessels would be provided to carry twenty thousand troops and would be escorted by the American Navy.
                            
The chief of Naval Operations ordered troop ships divisions seventeen and nineteen, on 26 September 1941, to prepare their vessels for approximately six months at sea. These transports were to load to capacity with food, ammunition medical supplies, fuel and water and were to arrive at Halifax, NS on or about 6 November and after the arrival of a British convoy from the UK were to load twenty thousand troops. The Prime Minister mentioned in his letter that it would be for the President to say what would be required in replacement if any of these ships were to be sunk by enemy action. Agreements were worked out for the troops to be carried as supernumeraries and rations to be paid out of Lend Lease Funds and officer laundry bills were to be paid in cash. All replenishments of provisions, general stores, fuel and water would be provided by the UK. Fuel and water would be charged for the escorts to the UK in Trinidad and Cape Town only. The troops would conform to US Navy and ships regulation. Intoxicating liquors were prohibited. It was further agreed that the troops were to rig and man their own anti-aircraft guns to augment the ships batteries.

So, convoy WS-12X is most extraordinary. 30 days BEFORE the Japanese attack on Pearl Harbor on 7 December 1941 and the German declaration of war on the USA on 11 December 1941; six American ships and escorts transported British soldiers.

Convoy William Sail WS-12X 

In early November, the troopship proceeded to Halifax, Nova Scotia, to take on board British troops.

Wakefield, with 6,000 men embarked, and five other transports Mount Vernon (AP-22), West Point (AP-23), Orizaba (AP-24),  Leonard Wood (AP-25) and Joseph T. Dickman (AP-26) got underway as Convoy WS12-X on 10 November 1941. Escorted by a strong screen – which, as far as Trinidad, included  – the convoy was destined for Basra, Iraq.

 
On 17 November 1941, the convoy reaches Trinidad. All ships were replenished, and the convoy departs Trinidad on 19 November 1941.

On December 7 at 2000, the convoy receives a radio communication of the Japanese attack on Pearl Harbor.

World War II service

Convoy WS12-X (continued)
On December 9, convoy WS12-X arrived in Cape Town, South Africa.

At about 0800 on 13 December 1941, the troopships departed Cape Town headed for Bombay.
 
At 650 on 21 December 1941, the USS Mount Vernon (AP-22) and USS Orizaba detached from the convoy headed for Bombay, and are bound for Mombasa. The remainder of the convoy continued to Bombay under the escort of HMS Dorsetshire, arriving on 27 December 1941.

Convoy BM 11

Wakefield, sailed for Singapore at 1300 on 9 January, in "15-knot" convoy BM11. In addition to the two American ships, Wakefield and West Point, three British transports —Duchess of Bedford, Empress of Japan, and Empire Star—made up the remainder of the convoy.

On 29 January 1942, Convoy BM 11 arrived at Singapore to disembark troops doomed later to capture by the Japanese upon the fall of the city in the following month.

Bombed at Keppel Harbor
On 30 January 1942, Wakefield commenced fueling at Keppel Harbour for the return voyage and awaited the arrival of some 400 British women and children who were being evacuated to Ceylon. At 1100, lookouts spotted two formations of Japanese bombers – 27 planes in each – approaching the dock area at Keppel Harbor. Unhampered by anti-aircraft fire or British fighter planes, the enemy bombers droned overhead and released a brief rain of bombs on the waterfront. A fire broke out, but it was extinguished in less than one-half hour. The ship's official damage report notes that wood furniture and fittings are contribute to the fires following such bomb hits, though in this case fires were brought under control quickly. The report noted that fire in a medical storeroom completely destroyed a wooden door allowing spread.U.S. Navy War Damage Reports contains numerous such reports for various ships. One of the features of the ship as the liner Manhattan had been the lavish use of rare hardwood panels, moldings and finishings in passenger spaces. Using oxygen masks, fire-fighting and damage control crew extricated five dead and nine wounded. Medical assistance soon came from West Point.

Completing her fueling, Wakefield embarked her passengers and got underway soon thereafter, burying her dead at sea at 2200 and pushing on for Ceylon. After disembarking her passengers at Colombo, the ship found that port authorities would not cooperate in arranging for repair of her damage. Wakefield, therefore, promptly sailed for Bombay, India, where she was able to effect temporary repairs and embark 336 American evacuees. Steaming home via Cape Town, the transport reached New York on 23 March and then proceeded to Philadelphia for permanent repairs.

Named a "lone wolf" transport
Underway on 11 May 1942 for Hampton Roads, Wakefield arrived at Norfolk, Virginia two days later to load cargo in preparation for Naval Transportation Service Operating Plan Lone Wolf. This provided for Wakefield to travel, for the most part, unescorted – relying on her superior speed to outrun or outmaneuver enemy submarines. On 19 May 1942, she embarked 4,725 Marines and 309 Navy and Army passengers for transportation to the South Pacific and moved to Hampton Roads to form up with a convoy bound for the Panama Canal Zone. Arriving at Cristóbal on 25 May 1942, Wakefield was released from the convoy to proceed west. After  escorted her out of the Canal Zone, Wakefield proceeded independently to New Zealand and arrived at Wellington on 14 June. Departing one week later, the transport steamed via the Panama Canal and reached New York on 11 July 1942.

On 6 August 1942, Wakefield departed New York with Convoy AT-18 – the largest troop convoy yet assembled. A dozen troop transports made up the bulk of the convoy, escorted by 12 warships – cruisers and destroyers. After proceeding via Halifax to Great Britain, Wakefield received orders routing her and three other transports to the River Clyde, where they arrived without incident. On 27 August 1942, Wakefield departed the Clyde estuary as part of Convoy TA-18, bound for New York.

Onboard fire
While the transport was en route to her destination, on the evening of 3 September 1942, fire broke out deep within the bowels of the ship and spread rapidly. In the port column of the formation, Wakefield swung to port to run before the wind while fire-fighting began immediately. Ready service ammunition was thrown overboard to prevent detonation, code room publications were secured, and sick bay and brig inmates were released.  and  closed to windward to take off passengers, a badly-burned officer, and members of the crew not needed to man pumps and hoses. Other survivors were disembarked by boat and raft, to be picked up forthwith by the screening ships.

At 2100, Brooklyn again came alongside to remove the remainder of the crew, while a special salvage detail boarded the ship. On 5 September 1942, towing operations commenced led by the Canadian salvage vessel Foundation Franklin and the big transport was put aground at McNab's Cove, near Halifax, at 1740 on the 8th. When fire-fighting details arrived alongside to board and commence the mammoth operation, fires still burned in three holds and in the crew's quarters on two deck levels. Four days later, the last flames had been extinguished, and the ship was re-floated on the 14th. On 18 September 1942 the ship was purchased by the Navy.

While Wakefield was undergoing partial repairs in Halifax harbor, a torrential rainstorm threatened to fill the damaged ship with water and capsize her at her berth. Torrents of rain, at times in cloudburst proportions, poured into the ship and caused her to list heavily. Salvage crews, meanwhile, cut holes in the ship's sides above the waterline, draining away the water to permit the ship to regain an even keel. For the next 10 days, the salvagers engaged in extensive initial repair work – cleaning up the ship, pumping out debris, patching up holes, and preparing the vessel for her voyage to the Boston Navy Yard for complete rebuilding.

Total rebuild
Temporarily decommissioned, the charred liner proceeded for Boston with a four-tug tow, and was declared a "constructive total loss." The Government purchased the hulk from the United States Lines and stripped the vessel to the waterline. The repairs and alterations began in the fall of 1942, and lasted through 1943. On 10 February 1944, Wakefield was recommissioned at Boston.

Various transport roles
She departed Boston on 13 April 1944, beginning the first of 23 round trips in the Atlantic theater, and three in the Pacific. Between 13 April 1944 and 1 February 1946, Wakefield transported 110,563 troops to Europe and brought some 106,674 men back to America – a total of 217,237 passengers.

In many cases, Wakefield operated as a "lone wolf", except for air coverage a few miles out of a port. Her primary port of call in the European theater was Liverpool – visited so often in fact that the transport's crew nicknamed her "The Boston and Liverpool Ferry." The average round-trip voyage took 18 days.

After D-Day, 6 June 1944, Wakefield began the first of her trips as a casualty-evacuation ship, bringing home wounded GIs. On occasion, she also brought back German prisoners of war for internment in the United States. Sometimes she even carried both evacuees and prisoners on the same voyage. After 13 trips to Liverpool, Wakefield was sent to the Mediterranean theater to carry men and equipment to Italy. She made three visits to Naples and a run each to Marseille, Oran, Taranto, Le Havre, and Cherbourg-Octeville. Returning from her 22nd voyage to Europe, the transport departed Boston on 4 December 1945 for Taku, China, and a Magic Carpet mission – returning to San Diego, California, on 1 February 1946. Two round trips to Guam, in February through April 1946, rounded out the ship's active service as a Navy transport.

Decommission
Mooring at New York on 27 May 1946, Wakefield was decommissioned on 16 June 1946 – five years to the day since she first entered service. There she was laid up in reserve, out of commission, with the Maritime Administration's Hudson River Reserve Fleet at Jones Point, New York. She was struck from the Navy Register in 1959. She was sold for scrap to Union Minerals & Alloys Corporation for $263,000 in 1965.

AwardsWakefield'' earned one battle star for her World War II service.

Footnotes

References

External links
AP-21 ''Wakefield, Navsource Online.

Troop ships of the War Shipping Administration
World War II auxiliary ships of the United States
Ships built by New York Shipbuilding Corporation
1931 ships
Maritime incidents in September 1942